Redcastle is a locality in the City of Greater Bendigo and the Shire of Campaspe in the Australian state of Victoria.

History 
Redcastle was established under the name "Balmoral" when gold was discovered in the area in 1859. Redcastle was a mining town until the 1880s when the population started to decrease. Many abandoned gold mines can still be found in the area.

References 

Bendigo
Towns in Victoria (Australia)
Suburbs of Bendigo